Isaak Illich Rubin (12 June 1886, in Dvinsk, Russian Empire (now Latvia) – 27 November 1937, in Aktyubinsk, Kazakh SSR) was a Soviet Marxian economist. His main work Essays on Marx's Theory of Value was published in 1924. He was executed in 1937 during the course of the Great Purge, but his ideas have since been rehabilitated.

Early life 
Born in to a wealthy Lithuanian Jewish family, Rubin became a revolutionary prior to the Revolution of 1905, when he was 19 years old. He first joined the Jewish Bund and later the Mensheviks. Rubin belonged to the Menshevik-Internationalists during the Russian Revolution, and was a member of its faction, which in 1920 opposed joining the now completely Russian Communist Party (b). The Bundists , who were leaning toward the Mensheviks, then left and founded the short-lived Social Democratic Union, of which Rubin served as secretary. From 1921 he too was subjected to repression and was repeatedly arrested by the Cheka. Because of his reputation, Rubin enjoyed preferential treatment and was allowed to continue writing his works. In addition, petitions from numerous influential Bolshevik intellectuals such as Anatoly Lunacharsky, Mikhail Pokrovsky and David Ryazanov also repeatedly called for his release. He was once again arrested in 1923 and imprisoned until December 1924, eventually being exiled to Crimea until 1926. 

He withdrew from politics in 1924, devoting himself to the academic study of Marxian economics, and in 1926 he joined the prestigious Marx-Engels Institute as a research assistant. The Marx-Engels Institute was headed by David Riazanov, against whom Joseph Stalin nursed a grudge.
 

Essays on Marx's Theory of Value was published in 1924. Prior to his arrest, Rubin also published books on the history of economics and contemporary economics, as well as editing an anthology of classical political economy. However, after the publication of this work, in 1928, criticism of his positions intensified. He was accused of distorting Marx's economic theory, taking an idealistic and metaphysical approach to economic categories, and separating form from content. He became the target of a campaign that culminated in an indictment published in Pravda in November 1930 accusing Rubin of being a member of a "Menshevik-kulak" conspiracy.

Persecution and death 
Rubin was arrested on December 23, 1930, and accused of being a member of the All-Union Bureau of Mensheviks, a fictitious secret organisation. Rubin, a trained lawyer and an economist, outwitted his first interrogators and the first charge was dropped; he was then transferred to a cell in Suzdal, where he was placed in solitary confinement and subjected to sleep deprivation.  

On January 28, 1931, Rubin was brought to another cell, where he was shown another prisoner and told that if he did not confess, the prisoner would be shot. Rubin refused and the prisoner was executed before him. The process was repeated the next night. After the second shooting, Rubin negotiated a "confession" with his interrogators, who insisted that he implicate his mentor David Riazanov as a member of a secret Menshevik conspiracy.

At 1931 Menshevik Trial, Rubin refused to confirm the existence of a Menshevik organisation. Although he agreed to make false statements regarding Riazanov's correspondence with other secret Mensheviks, he claimed that this was done on the basis of "great personal trust" rather than organisational discipline. As a result of this failure to fully cooperate with his prosecutors, Rubin was sentenced to five years in prison. Although he attempted to shield Riazanov from the worst charges, Rubin emerged from the experience "morally broken, destroyed, degraded to a state of complete hopelessness".

Rubin served most of his prison term in solitary confinement, during which he continued his research as best as he could. When he fell ill with a suspected cancer, he was removed to a hospital and encouraged to make further confessions in return for favourable treatment, but declined the offer. He was released on a commuted sentence in 1934 and allowed to work in Aktyubinsk, Kazakh SSR as an economic planner.

Rubin was arrested once more during the Great Purge on 19 November 1937. After this arrest he was never seen alive again. He was executed under the accusation of Trotskyist conspiracy on 25 November 1937.

Rubin's value theory 

Rubin's main work emphasised the importance of Marx's theory of commodity fetishism in the labor theory of value. Against those who counterposed Marx's early interest in alienation with his later economic theory, Rubin argued that Marx's mature economic work represented the culmination of his lifetime project to understand how human creative power is shaped, defined, and limited by social structures, which take on a uniquely "objective" economic form under capitalism. Significantly, Rubin is at pains to argue that simple commodity production is not a historical phenomenon that developed into capitalism, as it is often understood by both Marxists and critics of Marx; rather, it is a theoretical abstraction that explains one aspect of a fully developed capitalist economy. The concept of value, as understood by Rubin, cannot exist without the other elements of a full-blown capitalist economy: money, capital, the existence of a proletariat, and so on.

Influence and legacy 
Rubin's work was never reissued in the Soviet Union after 1928, but in 1972 Essays on Marx's Theory of Value was translated into English by Fredy Perlman and Milos Samardzija. This work became a foundation stone of the "value-form" approach to Marxist theory, exemplified by Hans-Georg Backhaus, Chris Arthur, Geert Reuten, and the "Konstanz–Sydney" group (Michael Eldred, Mike Roth, Lucia Kleiber, and  Volkbert Roth). In this interpretation of Marx, "it is the development of the forms of exchange that is seen as the prime determinant of the capitalist economy rather than the content regulated by it". Capitalism is here understood as a method of regulating human labor by giving it the social form of an exchangeable commodity (the "value-form"), rather than a disguised or mystified system that is otherwise similar in content to other class-based societies.

According to Arthur, the rediscovery of Rubin's "masterly exegesis" was "the most important single influence on the value form approach to Capital".

Selected publications 
 Rubin, Isaak Illich: Essays on Marx's Theory of Value. Translated by Milos Samardzija and Fredy Perlman from the third edition, Moscow, Leningrad 1928. Fourth Printing. Montreal, New York 1990.
 Rubin, Isaac Ilych: A History of Economic Thought Inklinks 1979. Translated and edited by Donald Filtzer from 2nd Revised Russian ed 1929.
 Rubin, Isaac Ilych: Studien zur Geldtheorie von Marx in Isaac Illych Rubin. Marxforscher – Okonom – Verbannter (1886-1937) Beitrage zur Marx-Engels-Forschung NF, vol. 4 Argument, Hamburg, 2012, pp. 9–118.

References

Further reading 
 Boldyrev, Ivan and Martin Kragh. "Isaak Rubin: Historian of Economic Thought During the Stalinization of Social Sciences in Soviet Russia," Journal of the History of Economic Thought. 2015. Vol. 37, Iss. 3. P. 363–386. 
 Joe, Hyeon-soo: Politische Ökonomie als Gesellschaftstheorie. Studien zur Marx-Rezeption von Isaak Iljitsch Rubin und Kozo Uno [German], Diss. Philipps-Universität Marburg 1995.
 Kubota, Ken: Die dialektische Darstellung des allgemeinen Begriffs des Kapitals im Lichte der Philosophie Hegels. Zur logischen Analyse der politischen Ökonomie unter besonderer Berücksichtigung Adornos und der Forschungsergebnisse von Rubin, Backhaus, Reichelt, Uno und Sekine (PDF), in: Beiträge zur Marx-Engels-Forschung. Neue Folge 2009, pp. 199–224. .
 Kubota, Ken: The Dialectical Presentation of the General Notion of Capital in the Light of Hegel's Philosophy: On the Logical Analysis of Political Economy with Special Consideration of Adorno and the Research Results of Rubin, Backhaus, Reichelt, Uno, and Sekine (PDF), in: Revista Dialectus 9 (2020), no. 18, pp. 39–65. .
 Paula, João Antonio; Cerqueira, Hugo. Isaac I. Rubin e sua história do pensamento econômico. Belo Horizonte: Cedeplar-UFMG, 2013. (in Portuguese).
 Vasina, Ljudmilla: I. I. Rubin – Marxforscher und Politökonom. [German], in: Beiträge zur Marx-Engels-Forschung. Neue Folge 1994, pp. 144–149.

External links 
 Writings of I. I. Rubin at marxists.org
 Selected bibliography with links and materials.

1886 births
1937 deaths
Writers from Daugavpils
People from Dvinsky Uyezd
Latvian Jews
Jews from the Russian Empire
Soviet Jews
Bundists
Mensheviks
Marxian economists
Marxist theorists
Historians of economic thought
Jewish historians
Jewish socialists
Soviet economists
1931 Menshevik Trial
Jews executed by the Soviet Union
Great Purge victims from Latvia